The action of 27 February 1941 was a single ship action between the British cruiser  and the Italian auxiliary cruiser . It began when Leander ordered an un-flagged freighter to stop for an inspection. The freighter raised the Italian colours and engaged Leander which sank Ramb I shortly after. Most of the Italian crew were rescued and taken to Addu Atoll, then Ceylon (now Sri Lanka). Leander patrolled southwards to investigate more reports of commerce raiders.

Background

East African Campaign

In January 1941, British forces simultaneously advanced from Sudan and Kenya into Eritrea, Abyssinia and Italian Somaliland, as the navy blockaded and bombarded Italian harbours. The port of Kismayu in Italian Somaliland was occupied on 14 February and sixteen Italian and German ships there were sunk or captured, except for one vessel. Merka and Mogadishu were occupied on 25 February and several hundred Allied merchant sailors were liberated. As Allied forces closed on Massawa, the Italian Red Sea Flotilla was ordered to break out and run for friendly ports. A group of Italian vessels consisting of the colonial ship Eritrea and the auxiliary cruisers  and  attempted to operate as commerce raiders while en route to Japan. The Italian squadron managed to evade the British blockade on 20 February and scattered into the Indian Ocean, Ramb I heading for the Dutch East Indies.

HMS Leander

Ramb I

Ramb I (3,667 GRT) was an auxiliary cruiser, a merchant ship adapted for naval service and lacked armour protection. Ramb I was armed with two  guns and eight  anti-aircraft machine guns. The ship had departed Suez on 10 June 1940 for Massawa on the Red Sea coast, from where the ship made short cruises along the coast of Eritrea but was mainly used for anti-aircraft defence of the port. As British and Commonwealth troops neared the port, Ramb I and Coburg (7,400 Gross Register Tons [GRT]), a German freighter, escaped from Massawa on the night of 20/21 February 1941 and passed into the Gulf of Aden. One ship was sighted near the island of Socotra off the Horn of Africa but it was considered too dangerous a location to attack.

Prelude

Acting on reports of commerce raiders in the area, Leander detached from convoy US 9 off Bombay on 22 February. Passing west of the Laccadive and Maldive islands, to a patrol area west of Huvadhu Kandu (One and a Half Degree Channel). The captain, Robert Bevan altered course to the north to head for One and a Half Degree Channel, because news of the capture of Mogadishu had been received by radio on the previous day. Italian ships in the port might have sailed along that route for the Far East.

Action
As Leander closed, a gun was seen on the ship's forecastle and the silhouette of the ship resembled an Italian Ramb-class fruit carrier. When ordered to give its signal letters, the ship hoisted four letters which were not listed in British signal books. Leander made the secret challenge but received no reply and the ship maintained its course and speed. A boarding party was standing by and at  the ship was ordered to stop instantly but no reply was received. A few minutes later, the ship hoisted the Italian merchant flag and trained its guns on Leander. At  the Italian ship opened fire and thirty seconds later, Leander replied. The Italian fire was inaccurate and it was estimated that only about three shells were fired from each gun.

A few shell splinters hit Leander, which fired five salvoes in a minute, then ceased fire to observe results. Leander made the flag signal "Do you surrender?", the Merchant flag was seen to be lowered and the crew began to abandon ship. Leander had hit the ship several times in the forepart and a fire burned, visible through a large hole in the side. A boat was lowered from Leander with a boarding party to try to save the ship and two lifeboats were seen leaving the vessel as men jumped overboard or scrambled down the side. An Italian officer in the water called out that the boarding party should not approach the ship, as it was burning and laden with ammunition. The boarding party laid off and as the fire spread, a big explosion before the bridge shot flames and smoke high into the sky, the ship settling bows first. As the fire burned, there was another explosion and five minutes later the ship sank under a cloud of black smoke. Leander recovered the boarding party and the Italian lifeboats, while edging away.

Aftermath
One Italian sailor had been killed by shellfire during the engagement; the Italian captain, ten officers and 92 sailors were rescued, of whom one man was seriously wounded, four were slightly injured. The seriously wounded man died in surgery during the afternoon and was buried at sunset. The prisoners said that Ramb I had been badly damaged by the shell hits and as Leander closed, the order to abandon ship had been given. Leander proceeded eastward and arrived at Addu Atoll the next morning. The Italian prisoners were transferred to the oiler Pearleaf with an armed guard of nineteen ratings and an officer; the ship made for Colombo, Ceylon (now Sri Lanka). Leander was sent to investigate wireless direction-finding indications that Axis ships were in the vicinity of the Saya de Malha Bank, several hundred miles south-east of the Seychelles Islands and north-east of Madagascar.

Footnotes

References

Further reading

External links
 Roskill War at Sea Vol. I via Hyperwar

Conflicts in 1941
Naval battles of World War II involving New Zealand
Naval battles of World War II involving Italy
Maritime incidents in February 1941
History of the Maldives
February 1941 events
Italy–New Zealand relations